The Prince of Heaven's Eyes is the third studio album by North Irish progressive rock band Fruupp, released on 8 November 1974 in the United Kingdom on the Pye label's underground and progressive music imprint Dawn Records. Recorded from August to September 1974 at Morgan Studios in London, it was the only album produced by Fruupp themselves. The band supported the recording with a two-month tour which commenced on 24 October with a highly successful concert in The Ulster Hall in Belfast. In January 1975, Stephen Houston left the band to become a Christian clergyman, and was replaced by John Mason, with whom Fruupp recorded their last album to date, Modern Masquerades (1975).

The Prince of Heaven's Eyes was the group's debut LP which had been promoted by 7" singles. The first single was "The Prince of Darkness" backed with "Annie Austere", released on 11 October 1974. During the recording sessions, Fruupp composed a song called "Prince of Heaven" credited for the first and only time the whole band. It is about the album concept as opposed to being part of it, and for that reason was not included on the album and was released as the second single with "The Jaunting Car" as a B-side. It was issued as a promo on 4 October 1974 and became available at retail on 18 October. Most subsequent reissues of The Prince of Heaven's Eyes on CD featured "Prince of Heaven" as a bonus track.

Track listing

Personnel

Fruupp
Peter Farrelly – lead vocals, bass guitar, flute
Stephen Houston – keyboards, oboe, vocals
Vincent McCusker – guitars, vocals
Martin Foye – drums, percussion

Technical personnel
Roger Quested – engineer
Paul Charles – story
Martin Cropper – art direction
Graham Marsh – illustration
Brian Lynch – inside photograph

References

Fruupp albums
1974 albums